I Know, But Where is the second studio album by Singaporean pop band The Sam Willows, released on 6 July 2018 through Sony Music Entertainment Singapore.

Production
Similar to their first album, Take Heart, the band had flown to Sweden with songwriters and producers to work on this album.

Track listing

References

2018 albums
The Sam Willows albums
Sony Music albums